Uğur Daşdemir, (born on November 10, 1990, in Turkey) is a Turkish professional football player who currently plays for 24 Erzincanspor.

References

External links
 
 

1990 births
Living people
Turkish footballers
People from Selim
Süper Lig players
TFF First League players
TFF Second League players
Kocaelispor footballers
Karşıyaka S.K. footballers
Darıca Gençlerbirliği footballers
Adanaspor footballers
Fatih Karagümrük S.K. footballers
24 Erzincanspor footballers
Association football fullbacks